Pakistan Institute of Public Finance Accountants  (PIPFA) is an autonomous body recognized mainly in the government sector and established under license from the Securities and Exchange Commission of Pakistan by the authority given under section 42 of the Companies Ordinance, 1984.

The body is co-sponsored by the Institute of Chartered Accountants of Pakistan, the Institute of Cost and Management Accountants of Pakistan and the Auditor General of Pakistan.

PIPFA has more than 8,500 members and a number of them are members of ICAP, ICMAP and ACCA.

The institute was established to produce a second tier of accounting professionals in Pakistan.

Mission statement
"identification, development and imparting knowledge to provide a structure for the training of accounting professionals in the specialized areas"

International recognition
PIPFA is the full member body of International Federation of Accountants (IFAC).

Administrative structure
There are 12 Governors on the Board. Three governors are appointed by each of the three sponsoring bodies and the members of the Association elect three.

In addition to the Board of Governors, PIPFA has the following committees: Examination Committee, Executive Committee, Publication and Seminar Committee, Board of Studies, Regulation and Discipline Committee. These committees are established for the following purposes:

 Education and training of students seeking professional qualification and membership of the Association.
 Investigation of cases of unethical conduct by the members or students and initiate the necessary disciplinary action.
 Provision of technical advice to the members on any accounting or auditing issues.
 Regional committees are organized to promote the professional education activity at regional levels through seminars and workshops

Educational requirements
The prerequisite entry requirement is Intermediate education from a recognized education board, university or institution or any other qualification considered equivalent by the Board of Governors or A Levels of General Certificate of Education.

Candidates who have passed CMA Program offered by ICMAP or CA Program by ICAP examinations are eligible for direct membership of the institute. On July, 2016 BOD announced Gateway entry test to membership for ICAP students and ICMAP students who has passed up to CAF and stage 4 respectively. The first gateway exams to be held in November 2016.

Global Affiliation
Association of Chartered Certified Accountants (ACCA) grants exemptions in five papers (F2, F3, F4, F5 &F7) to PIPFA affiliate and members.

Chartered Institute of Public Finance and Accountancy (CIPFA) grants Direct route to CIPFA membership for members of the Pakistan Institute of Public Finance Accountants(PIPFA).

Chartered Institute of Management Accountants (CIMA) grants complete exemption from certificate level and operational level consisting of seven papers.  (Operational level study case Excluded).

See also
 Chartered Institute of Public Finance and Accountancy
 IFACnet
 Institute of Chartered Accountants of Pakistan
 Institute of Cost and Management Accountants of Pakistan

References

External links
 
 IFACnet - A KnowledgeNet for Accountants in Business
 Accountancy Forum
 The Society of Accounting Education (SOAE Pakistan)

 The Institute of Certified General Accountants Pakistan (CGA-Pakistan)

 The Institute of Certified Internal Auditors Pakistan (CIA-Pakistan)

Professional accounting bodies
Professional associations based in Pakistan
Accounting in Pakistan
Organizations established in 1993
Pakistan federal departments and agencies
1993 establishments in Pakistan
Government agencies established in 1993